The 1995 Northwestern Wildcats football team represented Northwestern University in the 1995 NCAA Division I-A college football season. The 1995 season was a highly memorable one for the Northwestern program, as the Wildcats went 10–2 overall and 8–0 in the Big Ten Conference, earning their first winning season since 1971, their first conference championship since 1936, and their first 10-win season in school history. They also broke several long-standing losing streaks to regular opponents, including a 22-game losing streak to Iowa, a 19-game losing streak against Michigan, and a 14-game losing streak to Notre Dame.

"Expect Victory" was the motto even as Northwestern began the season as 28-point underdogs against Notre Dame, who they upset 17-15, propelling into the AP poll at #25. An upset loss to the Miami Redhawks in the second game of the season caused the Wildcats to drop out of the rankings. However, subsequent wins over ranked Michigan (19-13), Wisconsin (35-0), and Penn State (21-10) pushed the Wildcats into the top-10 while making them national media darlings.

Nine consecutive wins (including eight against Big Ten opponents) brought Northwestern their highest ranking since 1962 (#3), a conference title, and their first Rose Bowl appearance since 1949. In the Rose Bowl, the Wildcats' Cinderella season came to a conclusion with a 41–32 loss to the USC Trojans, and they finished the season at #8.

Northwestern was coached by Gary Barnett, who won multiple coach of the year awards for leading the dramatic turnaround of the program. Star players included the trio of quarterback Steve Schnur, running back Darnell Autry, and linebacker Pat Fitzgerald, who was named Big Ten and national defensive player of the year.

Schedule

Roster

Rankings

Game summaries

Notre Dame

Miami (OH)

The Wildcats surrendered a 21-point 4th quarter lead in their first game as a nationally ranked team since 1971. Miami of Ohio's Chad Seitz booted a 20-yard field goal as time expired to give the Redskins the victory. The opposing team was led by future Northwestern head coach Randy Walker and his offensive coordinator was Sean Payton. This would be the lone regular season blemish on the Wildcats' schedule.

Air Force

Indiana

Michigan

Minnesota

After falling behind 14–3 early in the second quarter, the Wildcats scored the next 24 points to take control of the game. Darnell Autry ran for 169 yards and 3 touchdowns, including a 73-yard burst early in the fourth quarter.

Wisconsin

The Wildcats forced 7 Badger turnovers (Wisconsin had 6 total in their first five games) in a triumphant homecoming matchup. The game marked the first sellout at Northwestern since 1984.

Illinois

Penn State

Iowa

Purdue

Northwestern got two big scoring plays in the first half – a 76-yard interception return for a touchdown by Chris Martin and a 72-yard touchdown reception by D'Wayne Bates – to take control. Darnell Autry carried the ball 32 times for a career-high 226 yards.

Rose Bowl

Awards and honors
Head coach Gary Barnett: Paul "Bear" Bryant Award, Walter Camp Coach of the Year, Big Ten Coach of the Year
Linebacker Pat Fitzgerald: Chuck Bednarik Award, Bronko Nagurski Trophy, Big Ten Defensive Player of the Year

1995 team players in the NFL
Darnell Autry
D'Wayne Bates

References

Northwestern
Northwestern Wildcats football seasons
Big Ten Conference football champion seasons
Northwestern Wildcats football